Monte Piana is a  tall mountain in the Sexten Dolomites and located on the border between the provinces of South Tyrol and Belluno. The smaller Northern summit of the mountain is named Monte Piano (2,305m).

During the so-called "White War" in World War I the mountain was hotly contested between the Austrian and Italian Armies. The Austrians had occupied the Northern summit Monte Piano, while the Southern summit Monte Piana was in Italian hands. Today many remnants of the fierce fighting can still be found on both summits.

History
When Italy declared war on Austria-Hungary on 24 May 1915, seven / eight battalions of the thirty-five stationed between San Candido and the Stelvio were sent to Monte Piana and its valleys. Monte Piana was part of the operational sector of the IV Army commanded by Lieutenant General Luigi Nava, whose units were divided into two sectors, Cordevole and Cadore, the first belonging to the IX Corps and the second, of which part of the sector of Monte Piana, under the jurisdiction of the 1st Army Corps commanded by Lieutenant General Ottavio Ragni. On 24 May the Piana was occupied by two platoons of Alpine troops of the 96th company, Pieve di Cadore battalion, of the 7th regiment. Other Alpini of the 67th company around 08:30 were hit by an artillery shell fired from Monte Rudo while they were working on the road from Misurina to Monte Piana; they were the first Italians to fall on a mountain that in less than two years made about 14,000 victims from both sides. Here, on 7 June 1915, second lieutenant Antonio De Toni (7th regiment, 268th company, batt. Val Piave) was fatally wounded, the first to be killed in the Padua university community.

At the end of the day, the two years of war on Mount Piana essentially led to nothing; the two contenders fought for two long years on a patch of land, without ever being able to subvert the enemy forces, and on 3 November 1917 the positions on the plain were abandoned by the Italian units to retreat and take sides on the Grappa line in an attempt to resist the Austro-Hungarian offensive in Caporetto

Between 1977 and 1981, on the initiative of the Austrian Colonel Walther Schaumann, the "Open-air Historical Museum of Monte Piana" was established and can be visited by all, free of charge. The works for the rearrangement of the trenches were carried out by the group "Friends of the Dolomites" (Dolomitenfreunde) with the reconstruction of the walkways, trenches, tunnels and stairways of the time. Every year since 1983, the restoration work of the trenches has been carried out during the first fifteen days of August, by the "Monte Piana Foundation" and the "Friends of the Dolomites" (who for the occasion formed the "Gruppo Volontari Amici del Piana" ")

In 1981, during the usual meeting on the first Sunday of September, dedicated to the commemoration of the fallen of Monte Piana, the "Friends of the Dolomites" handed over the open-air Historical Museum to the "Monte Piana Foundation", which then work area. In 1983, the newly established "Gruppo Volontari Amici del Piana" began its patient work of intervention on those elements that are damaged every year by bad weather and thaw.

Since that year, the volunteers are committed to faithfully reconstructing the sections of dry stone wall that collapsed during the winter; they recover what remains of the old shelters, restore the wooden structure and carry out a radical cleaning of the mountain from waste, in respect of the fact that this site has become a protected area. In addition, the access paths from the surrounding valleys are maintained and the relative signs are taken care of, currently assisted by retired colonel Elio Scarpa.

In 1986 the Group dedicated its name to the recently deceased vice president of the "Monte Piana Foundation", Elio Scarpa, who was thus given the credit for having made possible the launch of this initiative. But support for the work also came from the Italian army at the hands of the Alpine Troops Command, so the group of volunteers can use, during the work, an off-road vehicle, tents and various materials, in addition to valid help. of the military personnel placed at its disposal, for a collaboration that continues today

External links 

 http://www.worldwarone.it/2015/06/first-world-war-one-day-itineraries.html
 Photos Monte Piana:  und 
 Monte Piana on www.cimeetrincee.it (Italian)
 Monte Piana on Fronte Dolomitico (Italian)
 www.montepiana.com Maps of the summit area (Italian)

Mountains of the Alps
Mountains of Italy
Dolomites
Sexten Dolomites